Macro-Paesan (also spelled Macro-Paezan) is a proposal linking several small families and language isolates of northwest South America. Kaufman (2007) proposes the structure at the right. Paez–Barbacoan is commonly proposed, though Curnow (1998) argued that it (or at least Paez–Coconucan) is spurious.

Kunza–Kapixana was a more provisional suggestion (Kaufman 1990, 1994, 2007; Swadesh 1959),  but this connection is not widely accepted. Kunza is now generally considered to be a language isolate.

Jolkesky (2015) proposes lexical evidence linking the Páez, Andaqui (Andakí), and Tinígua languages.

References

Kaufman, Terrence. 2007. Atlas of the World's Languages, 2nd edition, 62–64. Routledge.

 
Indigenous languages of South America
Proposed language families